Sampo is a 1959 Soviet–Finnish fantasy film based loosely on the events depicted in the Finnish national epic Kalevala. In the United States, it was released in an edited version, The Day the Earth Froze, by American International Pictures as a double feature with Conquered City. This version was later featured in a 1993 episode of Mystery Science Theater 3000.

Plot
The people of Kalevala are a peaceful hard working people, they have everything they need and want, bar the mystical Sampo, a magical mill which will make grain, salt and gold and give prosperity to whoever possesses it. The only person in Kalevala able to make a Sampo is the smith Ilmarinen, however he cannot make it until his sister Annikki has fallen in love. Annikki eventually falls in love with the young hard working Lemminkäinen. All is not perfect, however. There is a dark dismal land called Pohjola ruled over by a wicked witch called Louhi, and she wishes for a Sampo, but her wizards are unable to forge one. Louhi is advised that only Ilmarinen is able to forge a Sampo. Louhi sends her enchanted cloak to bring Annikki to Pohjola as ransom. Lemminkäinen runs to Ilmarinen to inform him that his sister has been taken and vows to return her, Ilmarinen agrees to come with him and they set off on a boat constructed of an ancient oak tree.

On arrival Louhi demands they complete a simple task each, Lemminkäinen is asked to plow a field of snakes, which he does with the aid of a steel horse made by Ilmarinen.  Then after Louhi's wizards destroy their boat, blaming it on a great fish, Ilmarinen forges another ship from iron. The final task is set to Ilmarinen; he is to forge a Sampo. He sets to work and, after some failed bargaining for another task, and with the aid of the trolls of Pohjola on the bellows and the fire from heaven itself, he forges a beautiful Sampo, which immediately begins to make gold, grain and salt.

Lemminkäinen and Ilmarinen are reunited with Annikki and they set sail for Kalevala. Lemminkäinen is upset when he is informed that the people of Kalevala will never be able to reap the benefits of the Sampo and dives into the sea to swim back and recover it. Back in Pohjola, Lemminkäinen releases the mist from the prison Louhi has placed it in and it covers the whole land. When the mist clears the Sampo has gone and Lemminkäinen is on a boat heading back to Kalevala. His boat is wrecked on the ocean surface when Louhi orders that the wind be set free, and the Sampo is destroyed and Lemminkäinen presumed lost. Lemminkäinen manages to swim back to Kalevala and manages to return a small piece of the Sampo, which Väinämöinen announces will bring great prosperity and joy to the people of the land. Lemminkäinen and Annikki marry and a great feast and dance is arranged. However, Louhi, angry at the betrayal, comes to Kalevala and steals their sun. Returning it to Pohjola, she locks it in a deep mountain cave.

As Kalevala is plunged into perpetual darkness things look very bleak. However, Lemminkäinen is still hopeful, he asks Ilmarinen to forge a new sun, which he begins work on. But wise old Väinämöinen informs him it's futile and that they must go to Pohjola and recover the sun by force. Väinämöinen tells the people this battle will be fought using kantele and not bladed weapons. The people of Kalevala prepare by cutting trees and bringing all precious metals to Ilmarinen to forge the strings. When the two people (Kalevala and Pohjola) meet on a frozen lake for battle, Väinämöinen begins playing and the trolls of Louhi begin to drift to sleep. Louhi tries in vain to get them to fight, but she fails and her trolls fall down unconscious. Louhi then sends her magic cape to kill the people of Kalevala but it is beaten down into a hole in the ice. Lemminkäinen marches up to the mountain which contains the sun, and Louhi turns herself into stone in fear. Lemminkäinen slices the stone door of the mountain open with his sword, releasing the sun to shine over the lands of Kalevala.

The film ends with the people of Kalevala looking to the bright sky in wonder and happiness.

Cast
 Andris Ošiņš as Lemminkäinen
 Eve Kivi as Annikki
 Anna Orochko as Louhi
 Ivan Voronov as Ilmarinen
 Urho Somersalmi as Väinämöinen
 Ada Vojtsik as Mother of Lemminkäinen
 Georgi Millyar as Sorcerer
 Mikhail Troyanovsky as Soothsayer
 Marvin Miller (English dub) as Narrator

Production
Each scene was shot a total of four times (using two cameras), as the film was produced in both Russian and Finnish (with dialogue dubbed afterwards) and in both standard and anamorphic widescreen aspect ratios. The film used the Sovcolor color film process. Sampo was the first Finnish film to feature surround sound, with four channels.

The Day the Earth Froze
The US version The Day the Earth Froze received 24 minutes of cuts, decreasing the 91 minute runtime to 67 minutes; its credits were heavily altered: the original credits were replaced with English language titles. For example, Ptushko was credited as 'Gregg Sebelious', Andris Oshin was listed as 'Jon Powers', and Eve Kivi was listed as 'Nina Anderson'.

Deleted scenes include:
 Lemminkäinen confronting Louhi and her trolls, being escorted to the Sampo and standing in awe. While he is in awe of the Sampo's beauty he is murdered by a serpent bite and thrown into the sea.
 Lemminkäinen's mother searching for her son, asking a birch tree, the mountain path and the sun. She then walks across the sea to Pohjola and confronts Louhi, who tells her he has left his tribesmen behind. Lemminkäinen's mother refuses to believe this and Louhi reluctantly tells her the truth. Lemminkäinen's mother asks the gods for help and Lemminkäinen is washed up on the shore, she carries him back to Kalevala. Upon arrival Lemminkäinen's mother rubs soil into his lips and the birch tree gives her its sap, then the Sun glows brightly and Lemminkäinen is restored to life.
 Lemminkäinen's death and resuscitation by his mother.

Home media
The Finnish version has been released on DVD in 2014. It was restored by Finnish National Audiovisual Institute in 2014 to digital 4K format. In July 2022 this restoration was released on Blu-ray by the Deaf Crocodile video label. The Finnish edit has also been released on the Elonet service.

The US version The Day the Earth Froze was released on DVD in 2004 by Retromedia in a double-feature with The Magic Voyage of Sinbad, the US version of Ptushko’s earlier fantasy epic Sadko.

The Russian version has not been released on videotape or DVD. On January 1, 2021, Mosfilm released the Russian edit on their official YouTube channel.

References

External links
 
 
 2014 restoration at Vimeo
 Finnish edit of Sampo at Elonet
 Russian edit of Sampo, official Mosfilm YouTube release

Reviews
 Dave Sindelar review
 kiddiematinee.com review
 The Monster Shack review

1959 films
1950s fantasy adventure films
1950s multilingual films
Soviet epic films
Soviet fantasy adventure films
Finnish fantasy adventure films
Films directed by Aleksandr Ptushko
1950s Russian-language films
Films based on Finno-Ugric mythology
Works based on the Kalevala
Soviet multilingual films
1950s Finnish-language films
Finnish multilingual films
Films based on fairy tales
Russian-language Finnish films